Magpi is a software company, founded in 2003 by Joel Selanikio and Rose Donna under the name DataDyne, and is based in Washington, D.C., USA and Nairobi, Kenya.

The company's origins were detailed by Selanikio in a 2013 TED talk: "The Big Data Revolution in Health".

Users 

Magpi has been used by the WHO and others as part of evaluation efforts for the Global Polio Eradication Initiative.

In 2014, Magpi was used by the Instituto Nacional Saude Publica in Guinea-Bissau in a pilot investigation of SMS disease reporting.

Magpi continues to be used by the IFRC in the Central African Republic since 2013 to improve reporting from health facilities in conflict areas.

Awards 
Magpi has received numerous awards, including:
 21st Century Achievement Award for Collaboration – The Computer World (2012)
 FRIDA Award for contributing to the information society in Latin America (2010)
 Wall Street Journal Technology Innovation Award for Healthcare (2009)
The Tech Museum Award (2008)
 The Stockholm Challenge Award (2008)
 Social Enterprise of the Year – Fast Company (2009)
 The World Bank's Development Marketplace Competition (2003)

References

External links 
 
 Health Market Innovations Profile

Mobile device management software
Health information technology companies
Companies established in 2003
Information and communication technologies in Africa
Social enterprises